Golden Valley County is a county in the U.S. state of North Dakota. As of the 2020 census, the population was 1,736, making it the fourth-least populous county in North Dakota. The county seat is Beach.

The county should not be confused with the city of Golden Valley, which is located in Mercer County.

History
In the general election held November 8, 1910, the voters of Billings County chose to separate the western portion of Billings and form a new county. This result was immediately challenged in court; on September 19, 1912, the ND Supreme Court upheld the election result; therefore the legislature completed the county's organization on November 13, 1912.

Golden Valley was called 'Rattlesnake Flats' by early settlers, due to the large number of the snakes found in the area. The region was dubbed Golden Valley in 1902 after a group of land surveyors noticed that the sunlight gave the surrounding grasses a distinct golden color.

Election controversy
The vote in 1910 to create Golden Valley County was 837 for and 756 against. Shortly after the vote was certified, suit was filed against the Billings County Commission to overturn the result. The plaintiffs alleged that the certification of election was improper, and that certain pre-marked "unofficial" ballots printed by supporters of the new county were cast in place of official ballots, and should be voided. The trial court originally ruled in favor of the plaintiffs. The county appealed to the North Dakota Supreme Court, which upheld the county's certification of the election. The court also ruled the pre-marked ballots were invalid, but that the number of invalid votes was not sufficient to overturn the election results. The court's decision upholding the new county was made on September 19, 1912, and Golden Valley was formally organized on November 13, 1912.

Geography
Golden Valley County lies on the west line of North Dakota. Its west boundary line abuts the east boundary line of the state of Montana. Beaver Creek flows east-northeastward through the upper portion of the county, and Little Missouri River flows northeastward through the southeastern corner of the county, with gullies flowing southeastward draining the lower county into the Little Mo River. The county terrain consists of semi-arid hills, dedicated to agriculture in the level areas. The terrain slopes to the east and north, with its highest point on hills at the southwestern corner at 3,251' (991m) ASL.

Major highways
  Interstate 94
  North Dakota Highway 16

Adjacent counties

 McKenzie County (north)
 Billings County (east)
 Slope County (south)
 Fallon County, Montana (southwest)
 Wibaux County, Montana (west)

National protected area
 Little Missouri National Grassland (part)

Lakes
 Bosserman Lake
 Camels Hump Lake
 Odland Dam

Demographics

2000 census
As of the 2000 census, there were 1,924 people, 761 households, and 506 families in the county. The population density was 1.92 people per square mile (0.74/km2). There were 973 housing units at an average density of 0.97 per square mile (0.37/km2). The racial makeup of the county was 97.77% White, 0.73% Native American, 0.10% Asian, 0.31% from other races, and 1.09% from two or more races. 1.04% of the population is Hispanic or Latino of any race. 49.4% were of German, 13.7% Norwegian and 5.6% Polish ancestry.

There were 761 households, out of which 29.20% had children under the age of 18 living with them, 58.30% were married couples living together, 4.90% had a female householder with no husband present, and 33.40% were non-families. 31.50% of all households were made up of individuals, and 15.80% had someone living alone who was 65 years of age or older.  The average household size was 2.38 and the average family size was 3.01.

The county population contained 28.30% under the age of 18, 5.10% from 18 to 24, 22.20% from 25 to 44, 23.00% from 45 to 64, and 21.30% who were 65 years of age or older. The median age was 41 years. For every 100 females there were 92.60 males. For every 100 females age 18 and over, there were 88.10 males.

The median income for a household in the county was $29,967, and the median income for a family was $37,105. Males had a median income of $25,478 versus $18,000 for females. The per capita income for the county was $14,173. About 10.80% of families and 15.30% of the population were below the poverty line, including 21.40% of those under age 18 and 7.70% of those age 65 or over.

2010 census
As of the 2010 census, there were 1,680 people, 774 households, and 429 families in the county. The racial makeup of the county was 97.4% white, 0.6% American Indian, 0.6% black or African American, 0.1% Pacific islander, 0.1% Asian, 0.5% from other races, and 0.8% from two or more races. Those of Hispanic or Latino origin made up 2.1% of the population. In terms of ancestry, 69.0% were German, 14.7% were Norwegian, 10.7% were Polish, 7.9% were Irish, 7.5% were English, and 2.5% were American.

Of the 774 households, 22.7% had children under the age of 18 living with them, 48.4% were married couples living together, 4.3% had a female householder with no husband present, 44.6% were non-families, and 39.4% of all households were made up of individuals. The average household size was 2.10 and the average family size was 2.85. The median age was 45.9 years.

The median income for a household in the county was $33,333 and the median income for a family was $47,500. Males had a median income of $32,875 versus $26,750 for females. The per capita income for the county was $21,899. About 8.9% of families and 13.0% of the population were below the poverty line, including 17.7% of those under age 18 and 11.4% of those age 65 or over.

Communities

Cities
 Beach (county seat)
 Golva
 Sentinel Butte

Unincorporated communities

 Chama
 De Mores
 Ekre
 Rider
 Thelan
 Trotters

Townships

 Beach
 Bullion
 Delhi
 Elk Creek
 Garner
 Henry
 Lone Tree
 Pearl
 Saddle Butte
 Sentinel

Former townships
 Elmwood

Unorganized territories

 East Golden Valley
 Elmwood (formerly a township)
 North Golden Valley
 South Golden Valley

Politics
Golden Valley County voters have been reliably Republican for decades. In no national election since 1936 has the county selected the Democratic Party candidate (as of 2020).

Notable people
 Ernest Viggo Almquist,  commercial artist 
 Arthur C. Townley, founder of the North Dakota Nonpartisan League.

See also
 National Register of Historic Places listings in Golden Valley County, North Dakota

Gallery

References

External links
 Golden Valley County map, North Dakota DOT

 
1912 establishments in North Dakota
Populated places established in 1912